Typhina subburdigalensis is an extinct species of sea snail, a marine gastropod mollusk, in the family Muricidae, the murex snails or rock snails.

Distribution
This extinct species occurs in France.

References

subburdigalensis
Gastropods described in 1999